See Me is the seventh studio album by American singer Leela James. It was released by Shesangz Music under exclusive license to BMG Rights Management on July 30, 2021. The album debuted and peaked at number 98 on the US Top Album Sales. Its lead single, "Complicated", became her second chart topper on the US Adult R&B Airplay chart.

Critical reception
Chicago Reader editor James Porter noted that on "See Me, the production [...] might be the most experimental yet on a Leela James record." He found that "James sings against ominous guitars about the seeming impossibility of making it from day to day, with layers of overdubbed vocals crooning in assent. She never lets the production dominate, though, and remains in the center of the action at all times [...] Nearly two decades into her career, See Me shows that James is still making vital work."

Track listing
Credits adapted from the liner notes of See Me.

Charts

References

2021 albums
Leela James albums